Seashore Group is a Qatari-owned company and one of the largest multidisciplined business enterprises in the State of Qatar. Headquartered in Al Khor, the company was founded in 1989 by a Qatari businessman from Al Khor city Mr Saeed Al-Mohannadi in support with an Indian businessman Mr Mohamed Ali from Thrissur with an initial employee base of three workers. As of 2022, the company had 2,500 workers.

At present, SEASHORE GROUP is the largest, multidisciplined Engineering & Contracting company in the State of Qatar and offers wide ranges of services including but not limited to Design & Fabrication of Steel Structures, Civil Construction and Industrial Pipeline Works, leading Waste Management &amp; Environmental service provider, Hot-dip Galvanizing, Trading in tools, consumables, PPE etc., Supermarket, Tile Manufacturing, Tyre Recycling, Heavy Equipment and Logistics, Heavy Truck-Body Manufacturing, Stevedoring (Port) Services, Instrumentation and Automation, Gifts Items. Seashore has the first privately owned Steel Factory; Seashore Steel & Rolling Mill and Electromechanical Division are their new ventures. And also, Seashore is an Integrated Managements system (IMS) certified company holding three international standards, ISO 9001:2015 (Quality Management), ISO 14001:2015 (Environmental Management) and ISO 45001:2018 (Occupational Health and Safety Management). undergoing widely used international management procedures by highly skilled professionals & experts within the industry. Seashore is a true conglomerate and a corporate institution of global standards.

Subsidiaries

Seashore Steel & Pipe company
Seashore Group announced in January 2008 that it would be establishing Seashore Steel & Pipe Company, thereby creating the first private steel melting and rolling company in the country. The capacity of its plant was planned to be 120,000 to 150,000 tons of steel billets annually. The plant started trial production in September 2011 with a monthly production capacity of about 7,500 steel billets.

References

Conglomerate companies established in 1989
Conglomerate companies of Qatar
Qatari companies established in 1989